Scaptesyle luzonica is a moth in the subfamily Arctiinae. It is found in the Philippines (Luzon).

References

Natural History Museum Lepidoptera generic names catalog

Lithosiini